Uncertain Future is the debut album by American thrash metal band Forced Entry. It was released on June 30, 1989, on Combat Records.

Uncertain Future is known as one of the albums that established a distinctive thrash metal sound in the field of Seattle music. Musically, this album is a characteristic blend of thrash metal, speed metal, punk and progressive elements. These elements crystalized the "technical/progressive thrash" sound that Forced Entry would expand and improve on their next album As Above, So Below.

Reception 

AllMusic's John Book awarded the album four-and-a-half stars out of five, saying, "They changed the world of thrash with their debut album in 1989, featuring eerie power chords, awesome vocals, and a tremendous bass guitar sound. For an album recorded on a low budget, the sound is impressive. This album has yet to be appreciated by the masses."

Track listing 
All music by Forced Entry. All lyrics by Tony Benjamins, except track 6 (Brad Hull).

Personnel 
 Tony Benjamins – vocals, bass
 Brad Hull – guitar, vocals on track 6
 Colin Mattson – drums

References 

Forced Entry (band) albums
1989 debut albums
Combat Records albums